Racial separatism may refer to:

 Racial segregation, separation of humans into racial groups in daily life
 Black separatism,  a movement to create separate institutions for people of African descent in societies historically dominated by whites
 White separatism, a political movement that seeks separate economic and cultural development for white people

See also
 Separatist (disambiguation)
 Separate (disambiguation)
 Segregation (disambiguation)